One Tree Hill is a mountain peak at Mount Victoria in the Blue Mountains of New South Wales.

References

External links 
 Geographical Names Board of New South Wales 
 SIX Maps - New South Wales Government 

Mountain peaks of the Blue Mountains (New South Wales)